Following are the results of the 1954 Soviet First League football championship. FC Shakhter Stalino winning the championship.

First stage

Zone I

Number of teams by republics

Zone II

Number of teams by republics

Zone III

Number of teams by republics

Final stage
 
Played in Stalino

See also
 1954 Soviet Class A
 1954 Soviet Cup

References

 1954 at rsssf.com

1954
2
Soviet
Soviet